Rzeszówek may refer to the following places in Poland:
Rzeszówek, Lower Silesian Voivodeship (south-west Poland)
Rzeszówek, Świętokrzyskie Voivodeship (south-central Poland)